The nominees for the 2012 Ovation Awards were announced on September 11, 2012, at the L.A. Gay & Lesbian Center in Hollywood, California.  The awards were presented for excellence in stage productions in the Los Angeles area from September 1, 2011 to August 28, 2012 based upon evaluations from 250 members of the Los Angeles theater community.

The winners were announced on November 12, 2012 in a ceremony at the Los Angeles Theatre in Downtown Los Angeles.  The ceremony was co-hosted by actress Jane Kaczmarek and Herbert Siguenza, co-founder of the performance troupe Culture Clash.

Awards 
Winners are listed first and highlighted in boldface.

{| class=wikitable
|-
! style="background:#EEDD82; width:50%" | Best Production of a Musical (Intimate Theater)
! style="background:#EEDD82; width:50%" | Best Production of a Musical (Large Theater)
|-
| valign="top" |
 The Color Purple: A Musical – Celebration Theatre Hey, Morgan! – Black Dahlia Theatre 
 Spring Awakening – Over The Moon Productions
| valign="top" |
 Forbidden Broadway: Greatest Hits, Volume 2 – Musical Theatre West Avenue Q – 3-D Theatricals
 Miss Saigon – McCoy Rigby Entertainment and La Mirada Theatre for the Performing Arts  
 Hairspray – Musical Theatre West
 Two Gentlemen Of Chicago – Troubadour Theater Company
|-
! style="background:#EEDD82; width:50%" | Best Production of a Play (Intimate Theater)
! style="background:#EEDD82; width:50%" | Best Production of a Play (Large Theater)
|-
| valign="top" |
 Peace In Our Time – The Antaeus Company Nine Circles – Bootleg Theater
 What‘s Wrong With Angry? – Celebration Theatre
 The Elephant Man – Mechanicals Theatre Group
 All My Sons – The Matrix Theatre Company
 Couples Counseling Killed Katie – Ugly Dog Productions and Elephant Theatre Company
 Santasia: A Holiday Comedy – Whitefire Theatre
| valign="top" |
 Waiting For Godot – Center Theatre Group: Mark Taper Forum The Convert – Center Theatre Group: Kirk Douglas Theatre
 Good People – Geffen Playhouse
 A Wrinkle In Time – Mainstreet Theatre Company
 The Mystery of Irma Vep – Rubicon Theatre Company
|-
! style="background:#EEDD82; width:50%" | Best Presented Production
! style="background:#EEDD82; width:50%" | Best Season
|-
| valign="top" |
 War Horse – Center Theatre Group: Ahmanson Theatre Follies – Center Theatre Group: Ahmanson Theatre
 Red – Center Theatre Group: Mark Taper Forum
| valign="top" |
 Center Theatre Group Geffen Playhouse
 McCoy Rigby Entertainment and La Mirada Theatre for the Performing Arts  
 Musical Theatre West
 The Colony Theatre Company
|-
! style="background:#EEDD82" | Lead Actor in a Musical
! style="background:#EEDD82" | Lead Actress in a Musical
|-
| valign="top" |
 Davis Gaines as Cervantes/Quixote – Man of La Mancha – Musical Theatre West 
 Adam Shapiro as Joe/Swing – Hey, Morgan! – Black Dahlia Theatre 
 Michael A. Shepperd as Mister – The Color Purple: A Musical – Celebration Theatre
 Joseph Foronda as The Engineer – Miss Saigon – McCoy Rigby Entertainment and La Mirada Theatre for the Performing Arts  
 David Engel as Man 2 – Forbidden Broadway: Greatest Hits, Volume 2 – Musical Theatre West
 Larry Raben as Man 1 – Forbidden Broadway: Greatest Hits, Volume 2 – Musical Theatre West
 Gary Patent as Haskell – The Immigrant – West Coast Jewish Theatre
| valign="top" |
 Susanne Blakeslee as Woman 1 – Forbidden Broadway: Greatest Hits, Volume 2 – Musical Theatre West 
 Meagan English as Mrs. Farkas/Jen/Jackie/Black Pants Girl – Hey, Morgan! – Black Dahlia Theatre 
 Bets Malone as Princess Winnifred – Once Upon a Mattress – Cabrillo Music Theatre
 Cesili Williams as Celie – The Color Purple: A Musical – Celebration Theatre
 Valerie Fagan as Woman 2 – Forbidden Broadway: Greatest Hits, Volume 2 – Musical Theatre West
 Lesli Margherita as Aldonza – Man of La Mancha – Musical Theatre West
 Tami Tappan Damiano as The Lady Of The Lake – Spamalot – Musical Theatre West
|-
! style="background:#EEDD82" | Lead Actor in a Play
! style="background:#EEDD82" | Lead Actress in a Play
|-
| valign="top" |
 Alan Mandell as Estragon – Waiting For Godot – Center Theatre Group: Mark Taper Forum 
 Patrick J. Adams as Reeves – Nine Circles – Bootleg Theater
 Barry McGovern as Vladimir – Waiting For Godot – Center Theatre Group: Mark Taper Forum
 Troy Kotsur as Cyrano – Cyrano – Fountain Theatre and Deaf West Theatre Company 
 Jon Jon Briones as Mango – The Romance of Magno Rubio – John Anson Ford Theatre
 Jamie Torcellini as Nicodemus/Lady Enid/Alcazar/An Intruder – The Mystery of Irma Vep – Rubicon Theatre Company
 Steve Hofvendahl – Peace In Our Time – The Antaeus Company
| valign="top" |
 Pascale Armand as Jekesai/Ester – The Convert – Center Theatre Group: Kirk Douglas Theatre 
 Jacqueline Wright as Jon Benét – House Of Gold – Ensemble Studio Theatre-LA
 Jane Kaczmarek as Margie – Good People – Geffen Playhouse
 Anne Gee Byrd as Mary – The Savannah Disputation – The Colony Theatre Company
 Ellen Lauren as Hecuba – Trojen Women (After Euripides) – The J. Paul Getty Trust
 Anne Gee Byrd as Kate Keller – All My Sons – The Matrix Theatre Company
 Jessica Tuck as Actress – Couples Counseling Killed Katie – Ugly Dog Productions and Elephant Theatre Company
|-
! style="background:#EEDD82" | Featured Actor in a Musical
! style="background:#EEDD82" | Featured Actress in a Musical
|-
| valign="top" |
 Todrick Hall as Seaweed J. Stubbs – Hairspray – Musical Theatre West 
 Nathan Danforth as Nicky/Trekkie/Bad Idea/Etc – Avenue Q – 3-D Theatricals
 David Allen Jones as Prof. Marvel/Guard At The Gate/Wizard Of Oz – The Wizard of Oz – 3-D Theatricals
 Terrance Spencer as Harpo – The Color Purple: A Musical – Celebration Theatre
 Matt Walker as Ralphie – A Christmas Westside Story – Troubadour Theater Company
 Rob Nagle as Valentine – Two Gentlemen Of Chicago – Troubadour Theater Company
 Matt Walker as Proteus – Two Gentlemen Of Chicago – Troubadour Theater Company
| valign="top" |
 La Toya London as Shug Avery – The Color Purple: A Musical – Celebration Theatre 
 Tracy Lore as Queen Aggravain – Once Upon a Mattress – Cabrillo Music Theatre
 Kelly Jenrette as Nettie – The Color Purple: A Musical – Celebration Theatre
 Constance Jewell Lopez as Sofia – The Color Purple: A Musical – Celebration Theatre
 Tracy Lore as Velma Von Tussle – Hairspray – Musical Theatre West
 Beth Kennedy as Launce/Outlaw #3 – Two Gentlemen Of Chicago – Troubadour Theater Company
 Christine Lakin as Julia – Two Gentlemen Of Chicago – Troubadour Theater Company
|-
! style="background:#EEDD82" | Featured Actor in a Play
! style="background:#EEDD82" | Featured Actress in a Play
|-
| valign="top" |
 Hugo Armstrong as Lucky – Waiting For Godot – Center Theatre Group: Mark Taper Forum 
 Kevin Mambo as Chancellor – The Convert – Center Theatre Group: Kirk Douglas Theatre
 Jonathan Cake as Frank – The Grönholm Method – Falcon Theatre
 Stephen Spinella as Rick – The Grönholm Method – Falcon Theatre
 Jemal McNeil as Henderson – Cages – LDG Productions LLC
 Chris Butler as Caesar Wilks – Gem of the Ocean – Rubicon Theatre Company
 Josh Clark as Father Murphy – The Savannah Disputation – The Colony Theatre Company
| valign="top" |
 Zainab Jah as Prudence – The Convert – Center Theatre Group: Kirk Douglas Theatre 
 Kelly Schumann as Linda – What‘s Wrong With Angry? – Celebration Theatre
 Cheryl Lynn Bruce as Mai Tamba – The Convert – Center Theatre Group: Kirk Douglas Theatre
 Sara Botsford as Jean – Good People – Geffen Playhouse
 Marylouise Burke as Dottie – Good People – Geffen Playhouse
 Bonnie Bailey-Reed as Margaret – The Savannah Disputation – The Colony Theatre Company
 Rebecca Mozo as Melissa – The Savannah Disputation – The Colony Theatre Company
|-
! style="background:#EEDD82" | Acting Ensemble of a Musical
! style="background:#EEDD82" | Acting Ensemble for a Play
|-
| valign="top" |
 The cast of The Color Purple: A Musical – Celebration Theatre 
 The cast of Hey, Morgan! – Black Dahlia Theatre 
 The cast of Ring of Fire, the Music of Johnny Cash – Cabrillo Music Theatre 
 The cast of Forbidden Broadway: Greatest Hits, Volume 2 – Musical Theatre West
 The cast of Spring Awakening – Over The Moon Productions
| valign="top" |
 The cast of Waiting For Godot – Center Theatre Group: Mark Taper Forum 
 The cast of Nine Circles – Bootleg Theater
 The cast of The Convert – Center Theatre Group: Kirk Douglas Theatre
 The cast of The Grönholm Method – Falcon Theatre
 The cast of Good People – Geffen Playhouse
 The cast of The Jacksonian – Geffen Playhouse
 The cast of The Savannah Disputation – The Colony Theatre Company
|-
! style="background:#EEDD82" | Director of a Musical
! style="background:#EEDD82" | Director of a Play
|-
| valign="top" |
 Michael Matthews – The Color Purple: A Musical – Celebration Theatre 
 Matt Shakman – Hey, Morgan! – Black Dahlia Theatre 
 William Selby – Forbidden Broadway: Greatest Hits, Volume 2 – Musical Theatre West
 Rick Sparks – I Love Lucy Live On Stage – Rockahn, LLC
 Patrick Pearson – Rooms: A Rock Romance – The Chance Theater
| valign="top" |
 Emily Mann – The Convert – Center Theatre Group: Kirk Douglas Theatre 
 Michael Matthews – What‘s Wrong With Angry? – Celebration Theatre
 Michael Arabian – Waiting For Godot – Center Theatre Group: Mark Taper Forum
 Gates McFadden – House Of Gold – Ensemble Studio Theatre-LA
 Matt Shakman – Good People – Geffen Playhouse
 Neil Patrick Stewart – The Elephant Man – Mechanicals Theatre Group
 Jenny Sullivan – The Mystery of Irma Vep – Rubicon Theatre Company
|-
! style="background:#EEDD82" | Music Direction
! style="background:#EEDD82" | Choreography
|-
| valign="top" |
 Gregory Nabours – The Color Purple: A Musical – Celebration Theatre David Richman – Hey, Morgan! – Black Dahlia Theatre
 Jeff Lisenby – Ring of Fire, the Music of Johnny Cash – Cabrillo Music Theatre 
 Matthew Smedal – Forbidden Broadway: Greatest Hits, Volume 2 – Musical Theatre West
 Rachael Lawrence – Spring Awakening – Over The Moon Productions
 Eric Heinly – A Christmas Westside Story – Troubadour Theater Company
 Eric Heinly – Two Gentlemen Of Chicago – Troubadour Theater Company
| valign="top" |
 Janet Roston – The Color Purple: A Musical – Celebration Theatre 
 Lili Fuller, Matthew Krumpe, Adam North, Joe Sofranko & Juliana Tyson  – Stations: A Los Angeles Holiday Story – Ensemble Theatre Company & Boom Kat Dance Theatre
 Dana Solimando – Miss Saigon – McCoy Rigby Entertainment and La Mirada Theatre for the Performing Arts 
 Lee Martino – Hello! My Baby – Rubicon Theatre Company
 Lisa Hopkins – Dames at Sea – The Colony Theatre Company
 Tina Kronis – The Treatment – The Theatre @ Boston Court
 Molly Alvarez – A Christmas Westside Story – Troubadour Theater Company
|-
! style="background:#EEDD82" | Book for an Original Musical
! style="background:#EEDD82" | Lyrics/Music for an Original Musical
|-
| valign="top" |
 Isaac Laskin and Matt Fogel – Hey, Morgan! – Black Dahlia Theatre Parmer Fuller – Stations: A Los Angeles Holiday Story – Ensemble Theatre Company & Boom Kat Dance Theatre
 Cheri Steinkellner – Hello! My Baby – Rubicon Theatre Company
| valign="top" |
 Parmer Fuller and Michael Kramer – Stations: A Los Angeles Holiday Story – Ensemble Theatre Company & Boom Kat Dance Theatre 
 Matthew Fogel, Isaac Laskin, And David Richman – Hey, Morgan! – Black Dahlia Theatre
 Masato Baba – The Brahmin and the Tiger – Company Of Angels & Hereandnow Theatre Company
|-
! style="background:#EEDD82" | Playwrighting For An Original Play
! style="background:#EEDD82" | 
|-
| valign="top" |
 Andrew Dolan – The Many Mistresses Of Martin Luther King  Ensemble Studio Theatre-LA
 Lisa Loomer – Café Vida –   Cornerstone Theater Company
 Stephen Sachs – Cyrano – Fountain Theatre and Deaf West Theatre Company 
 Keith Stevenson – Out There on Fried Meat Ridge Rd. – Pacific Resident Theatre
 Christina Hart – Birds of a Feather – The Complex
 Evelina Fernandez – Hope: Part II of a Mexican Trilogy – The Los Angeles Theatre Center
 Johnny O‘Callaghan – Who‘s Your Daddy? – The Victory Theatre Center
| valign="top" |
|-
! style="background:#EEDD82" | Lighting Design (Intimate Theater)
! style="background:#EEDD82" | Lighting Design (Large Theater)
|-
| valign="top" |
 Luke Moyer – Deathtrap – L.A. Gay & Lesbian Center
 Timothy Swiss – The Color Purple: A Musical – Celebration Theatre
 Jeremy Pivnick – The King of the Desert – Coactive Content LLC
 Hilda Kane – The Elephant Man – Mechanicals Theatre Group
 Brandon Baruch – Spring Awakening – Over The Moon Productions
 Jeremy Pivnick – Peace In Our Time – The Antaeus Company
 Jaymi Smith – The Children – The Theatre @ Boston Court
| valign="top" |
 Lap Chi Chu – The Convert – Center Theatre Group: Kirk Douglas Theatre 
 Jean-Yves Tessier – Ring of Fire, the Music of Johnny Cash – Cabrillo Music Theatre 
 David Weiner – American Night: The Ballad Of Juan Jose – Center Theatre Group: Kirk Douglas Theatre
 Geoff Korf – The Night Watcher – Center Theatre Group: Kirk Douglas Theatre
 Brian Gale – Waiting For Godot – Center Theatre Group: Mark Taper Forum
 Elizabeth Harper – Good People – Geffen Playhouse
 Steven Young – Miss Saigon – McCoy Rigby Entertainment and La Mirada Theatre for the Performing Arts  
 Brian Gale – A Wrinkle In Time – Mainstreet Theatre Company
|-
! style="background:#EEDD82" | Scenic Design (Intimate Theater)
! style="background:#EEDD82" | Scenic Design (Large Theater)
|-
| valign="top" |
 Tom Buderwitz – Peace In Our Time – The Antaeus Company
 Tom Buderwitz – Slow Dance In Midtown – Bella Vita Entertainment
 Tom Buderwitz – The Many Mistresses Of Martin Luther King – Ensemble Studio Theatre-LA
 Joel Daavid – Deathtrap – L.A. Gay & Lesbian Center
 Haley Ho – The Elephant Man – Mechanicals Theatre Group
 Desma Murphy – The Water‘s Edge – Road Theatre Company
 Joe Holbrook – Rooms: A Rock Romance – The Chance Theater
| valign="top" |
 Daniel Ostling – The Convert – Center Theatre Group: Kirk Douglas Theatre 
 John Lee Beatty – Poor Behavior – Center Theatre Group: Mark Taper Forum
 John Iacovelli – Waiting For Godot – Center Theatre Group: Mark Taper Forum
 Craig Siebels – Good People – Geffen Playhouse
 Tom Buderwitz – Honus & Me – Mainstreet Theatre Company
 John Iacovelli – The Heiress – Pasadena Playhouse
 Stephen Gifford – Old Wicked Songs – The Colony Theatre Company
|-
! style="background:#EEDD82" | Sound Design (Intimate Theater)
! style="background:#EEDD82" | Sound Design (Large Theater)
|-
| valign="top" |
 Veronika Vorel and John Zalewski – The Children – The Theatre @ Boston Court
 Ken Sawyer – Deathtrap – L.A. Gay & Lesbian Center
 Joseph Slawinski – Eternal Thou – McCray Productions
 David Marling – The Water‘s Edge – Road Theatre Company
 John Zalewski – Peace In Our Time – The Antaeus Company
 Martin Carrillo – Have You Seen Alice? – Theatre Of NOTE
 Bill Froggatt – Wicked Lit 2011 – Unbound Productions
| valign="top" |
 John Zalewski – A Wrinkle In Time – Mainstreet Theatre Company 
 Darron L. West – American Night: The Ballad Of Juan Jose – Center Theatre Group: Kirk Douglas Theatre
 Darron L. West – The Convert – Center Theatre Group: Kirk Douglas Theatre
 Joe Sofranko – Stations: A Los Angeles Holiday Story – Ensemble Theatre Company And Boom Kat Dance Theatre
 Jon Gottlieb – Radiance: The Passion Of Marie Curie – Geffen Playhouse
 Erik Carstensen – The Pianist Of Willesden Lane – Geffen Playhouse
 David Beaudry – The Mystery of Irma Vep – Rubicon Theatre Company
 Drew Dalzell – Old Wicked Songs – The Colony Theatre Company
|-
! style="background:#EEDD82" | Costume Design (Intimate Theater)
! style="background:#EEDD82" | Costume Design (Large Theater)
|-
| valign="top" |
 Shon Leblanc – I Love Lucy Live On Stage – Rockahn, LLC
 Vicki Conrad – The Learned Ladies – Actors Co-Op Theatre Company
 Naila Aladdin Sanders – The Color Purple: A Musical – Celebration Theatre
 Jessica Olson – Stoneface: The Rise and Fall and Rise of Buster Keaton – Sacred Fools Theater Company
 Ashley Hayes – Dolls! Not Your Usual Love Story – Santa Monica Playhouse
 Jessica Olson – Peace In Our Time – The Antaeus Company
 Marcy Froehlich – All My Sons – The Matrix Theatre Company
| valign="top" |
 Paul Tazewell – The Convert – Center Theatre Group: Kirk Douglas Theatre 
 Angela Calin – The Bungler – A Noise Within
 Esosa – American Night: The Ballad Of Juan Jose – Center Theatre Group: Kirk Douglas Theatre
 Christopher Acebo – Waiting For Godot – Center Theatre Group: Mark Taper Forum
 Kim Deshazo – Southern Comforts – Falcon Theatre
 Alvin Colt – Forbidden Broadway: Greatest Hits, Volume 2 – Musical Theatre West
 Leah Piehl – The Heiress – Pasadena Playhouse
|}

 Ovation Honors 

Ovation Honors, which recognize outstanding achievement in areas that are not among the standard list of nomination categories, were presented when the nominations were announced.

 Composition for a Play – Ryan Johnson – Stoneface: The Rise and Fall and Rise of Buster Keaton – Sacred Fools Theater Company
 Fight Choreography – Andrew Amani – Hearts Like Fists – Theatre Of NOTE
 Puppet Design – Susan Gratch – The Children – The Theatre @ Boston Court
 Video Design – Brian Gale – Waiting For Godot – Center Theatre Group: Mark Taper Forum
 Certificate of Achievement in Video Design – Shawn Sagady – American Night: The Ballad Of Juan Jose'' – Center Theatre Group: Kirk Douglas Theatre

References 

Ovation Awards
Ovation
2012 in Los Angeles
Ovation